Schinia hulstia, or Hulst's flower moth, is a moth of the family Noctuidae. The species was first described by Tepper in 1883. It is found on US the Great Plains from North Dakota to Texas, in the south ranging eastward to Arkansas and westward to California.

The wingspan is about 24 mm.

Etymology
The specific name is described by John Bernhardt Smith as being chosen in honor of George Duryea Hulst, "a good entomologist and a well known authority on the Catocalinae."

References

Schinia
Moths of North America
Moths described in 1883